Pseudonebularia chrysalis, common name the chrysalis mitre, is a species of sea snail, a marine gastropod mollusk in the family Mitridae, the miters or miter snails.

Description
The shell size varies between 12 mm and 30 mm.

Distribution
This species occurs in the Red Sea and in the Indian Ocean off Madagascar, the Mascarene basin and Tanzania; in the Pacific Ocean off the Philippines, Indonesia, Okinawa, Papua New Guinea and Australia.

References

 Spry, J.F. (1961). The sea shells of Dar es Salaam: Gastropods. Tanganyika Notes and Records 56
 Cernohorsky W. O. (1976). The Mitrinae of the World. Indo-Pacific Mollusca 3(17) page(s): 402
 Drivas, J. & M. Jay (1988). Coquillages de La Réunion et de l'île Maurice
 Richmond, M. (Ed.) (1997). A guide to the seashores of Eastern Africa and the Western Indian Ocean islands. Sida/Department for Research Cooperation, SAREC: Stockholm, Sweden. . 448 pp

External links
 Gastropods.com : Mitra (Nebularia) chrysalis; accessed : 10 December 2010

Mitridae
Gastropods described in 1844